Boldyrevka is a rural locality (a selo) and the administrative center of Boldyrevsky Selsoviet of Zavitinsky District, Amur Oblast, Russia. The population was 485 as of 2018. There are 15 streets.

Geography 
Boldyrevka is located on the left bank of the Polovinka River, 18 km north of Zavitinsk (the district's administrative centre) by road. Avramovka is the nearest rural locality.

References 

Rural localities in Zavitinsky District